Mellrichstadt is a town in the district Rhön-Grabfeld, in Bavaria, Germany. It is situated 17 km southwest of Meiningen, and 13 km northeast of Bad Neustadt. It includes the following villages: Bahra, Eußenhausen, Frickenhausen, Mühlfeld, Sondheim im Grabfeld und Roßrieth.

Literature 
Features in John Douglas-Gray's thriller 'The Novak Legacy'

References 

Rhön-Grabfeld